Stu Phillips may refer to:
 Stu Phillips (composer) (born 1929), American film music composer
 Stu Phillips (country singer) (born 1933), Canadian-born country music performer and Grand Ole Opry member

See also
Stewart Phillips, English footballer